Maidenhead is a town in Berkshire in England.

Maidenhead may also refer to:
Maidenhead (UK Parliament constituency)
Royal Borough of Windsor and Maidenhead
Maidenhead, New Jersey, the original name of Lawrenceville, New Jersey
Maidenhead Township, New Jersey, the original name of Lawrence Township, Mercer County, New Jersey
 Maiden Head, a hamlet in the parish of Dundry in North Somerset, UK
The Maidenhead Locator System
An archaic reference to:
the hymen
virginity